The Queen is a 2009 British drama-documentary showing Queen Elizabeth II at different points during her life. Broadcast on Channel 4 over five consecutive nights from 29 November 2009, the Queen is portrayed by a different actress in each episode. The series was co-funded by the American Broadcasting Company, the network which aired the series in the US.

This marked the first of two times Emilia Fox and Katie McGrath portrayed sisters: they would go on to appear as Morgause and Morgana in BBC One's Merlin.

Cast
Steven Mackintosh as the Narrator

Episode 1
Emilia Fox as Queen Elizabeth II
Katie McGrath as Princess Margaret
Tristan Sturrock as Peter Townsend
Simon Williams as Alan "Tommy" Lascelles
Robert Bathurst as Anthony Eden

Episode 2
Samantha Bond as Queen Elizabeth II
Philip Jackson as Harold Wilson
Richard Derrington as Willie Hamilton
Abby Ford as Princess Anne
Graham O'Mara as Ian Ball
Jonathan Hyde as Martin Charteris
Nicholas Le Prevost as Prince Philip
Lloyd McGuire as Edward Heath
Ryan Quish as Mark Phillips

Episode 3
Susan Jameson as Queen Elizabeth II
Lesley Manville as Margaret Thatcher
Peter Davison as Denis Thatcher
Roger Alborough as William Heseltine
Clive Francis as Prince Philip
Simon Shackleton as Nigel Wicks
Michael Maloney as Michael Shea
Paul Clayton as Bernard Ingham

Episode 4
Barbara Flynn as Queen Elizabeth II
Paul Rhys as Prince Charles
Dominic Jephcott as Robert Fellowes
Ian Shaw as Richard Aylard
Emily Hamilton as Diana Spencer
Lucy Chalkley as Sarah Ferguson
Doreen Mantle as Queen Elizabeth The Queen Mother
Kenneth Colley as Prince Philip
Christian Wolf-La'Moy as William Bartholomew

Episode 5
Diana Quick as Queen Elizabeth II
Martin Turner as Prince Charles
Joanna Van Gyseghem as Camilla Parker Bowles
Anthony Smee as Robin Janvrin
Rick Bacon as Mark Bolland
Hugh Simon as Stephen Lamport
June Bailey as Queen Elizabeth The Queen Mother
Robert Ashby as King Constantine II of Greece
Davyd Harries as Clergyman

Production
The series was shot in Southern England. Locations used in the filming included Stourhead House, Longleat, Neston Park, Grittleton House, Knebworth House and the Orchardleigh Estate.

Episodes

References

External links

2009 British television series debuts
2009 British television series endings
2000s British documentary television series
2000s British drama television series
Channel 4 original programming
Cultural depictions of Elizabeth II
Cultural depictions of Charles III
Cultural depictions of Diana, Princess of Wales
Cultural depictions of Margaret Thatcher
2009 in British television
English-language television shows